Bridgewater House may refer to:

Bridgewater House, Manchester
Bridgewater House, Runcorn, Cheshire
Bridgewater House, Westminster, London
A planned BBC studio in Bristol, South West England; see Broadcasting House, Bristol

Architectural disambiguation pages